Ilford railway station is on the Great Eastern Main Line serving the town of Ilford in the London Borough of Redbridge, east London. Its three-letter station code is IFD and it is in Travelcard zone 4.

The station was opened in 1839 by the Eastern Counties Railway.

History
Ilford railway station was opened on 20 June 1839 by the Eastern Counties Railway, along with the Mile End (temporary terminus) to  section of what was to become the Great Eastern Main Line.

Between 1903 and 1947, trains also ran through to Woodford via the Fairlop Loop, most of which was later transferred to London Underground's Central line. The triangular junction (Seven Kings being the third point of the triangle) is now the site of carriage sheds and a maintenance depot operated by Bombardier Transportation. Freight trains used the connection from the Fairlop Loop to Seven Kings until 1956.

A dairy siding was located at Ilford siding that received milk traffic from Halesworth and North Elmham in East Anglia. This traffic ceased in the 1960s.

Accidents and incidents 
On New Year's Day of 1915 the station was the scene of a major collision in which 10 people were killed.

Lieutenant-Colonel Frank Heilgers, a Member of Parliament, was one of nine people killed in the 1944 Ilford rail crash.

Layout

The main entrance, in Cranbrook Road, was heavily rebuilt during the 1980s, with architecture in keeping with other contemporary buildings in Ilford such as the Central Library. This stretch of Cranbrook Road was originally called Station Road but this name was transferred to a short portion of Havelock Street immediately opposite the station. There is also a secondary entrance on York Road, from which the western (London) ends of the platforms can be reached via a footbridge. This entrance was refurbished in 2016.

The station has four operational platforms: two "up" (headed west toward London) and two "down" (towards Shenfield). A bay platform numbered platform 5 remains in situ but is disused as the track alongside it was removed in 2016. Regular stopping services typically use platforms 3 and 4 on the electric line between London and Shenfield, while platforms 1 and 2 are used only during engineering work and line disruptions as the two adjacent tracks are used by through-trains on the main line. Immediately to the west of the station is a flyover that allows the main line to cross over from the south side of the electric line to the north, and thus easily access the longer northern platforms at Liverpool Street without having the cross over in the station throat. The tracks cross the River Roding at the same point, and pass under the North Circular Road.

The platforms at Ilford are several metres below street-level, as the road rises up to pass over the railway line. The north side of the station is edged by an embankment lined with housing. The south side is lined with large buildings (the Valentine House office building, the former British Gas building now converted to residential use and a large British Telecom building, whose rooftop logo can be seen from passing trains) and platform level approximates to street-level by the far end of the station. Despite the steps to the platforms, wheelchair lifts are available by prior arrangement. There are two access stairways from the concourse to platforms 3 and 4. This is in order to segregate arriving and departing passengers. The down staircase goes immediately from the concourse to the station platform whilst the up staircase rises from approximately 100 m along the platform and is connected by an elevated walkway to the concourse.

The 1980s station building closed on 25 January 2020 and its demolition began the following day. Its replacement opened to the public on 1 September 2022. A third, southern entrance, next to Ilford Hill (top picture) opened on 23 May 2021.

Services
The typical off-peak service is eight trains per hour in each direction between Paddington and Shenfield (on Sundays four of the eight trains terminate instead at Gidea Park).

Connections
London Buses routes 123, 128, 145, 150, 167, 179, 296, 364, 366, 396, 462 and school routes 667, 677 and 679 serve the station from Cranbrook Road, while routes 25, 86, 147, 169, 425, EL1, W19 and night routes N25 and N86. 123, 128, 145, 296 and EL1 are 24-hour services serve the station from Ilford Hill/Chapel Road.

References

External links

Railway stations in the London Borough of Redbridge
Former Great Eastern Railway stations
Railway stations in Great Britain opened in 1839
Railway stations served by the Elizabeth line
Railway stations
DfT Category C1 stations